The discography of the voice actress and J-pop singer Nana Mizuki consists of 13 studio albums, 3 compilation albums, 42 singles, 24 video releases, over 60 official music videos, and over 100 other appearances. The first release with Mizuki as a singer was the "Girl's Age" image song single in 1998 for the fictional character Chisato Kadokura from the NOëL video game series. Mizuki would not release her debut single "Omoi" until 2000, which was followed by two more singles and her debut album Supersonic Girl in 2001. Supersonic Girl was Mizuki's first release to chart on the Japanese Oricon albums chart, peaking at No. 60. Mizuki released one album a year for the next three years, starting with Magic Attraction (2002), followed by Dream Skipper (2003), and Alive & Kicking (2004). "Innocent Starter" (2004), one of two singles from Alive & Kicking, was her first single to reach the top 10 Oricon singles chart, peaking at No. 9.

Mizuki's fifth album Hybrid Universe (2006) was her first album to reach the top 5 Oricon albums chart, achieving a peak at No. 3. "Eternal Blaze" (2005), one of three singles from Hybrid Universe, was her first single to peak at No. 2. Mizuki has continued to show success in her single releases: every single released after "Eternal Blaze" has achieved a peak in the top 5 Oricon singles chart, except for "Super Generation" (2006), which peaked at No. 6, and "Metanoia" (2019), which peaked at No. 8. Mizuki's 20th single "Mugen" (2009) marked her tenth single to reach the top 10 on Oricon's singles chart. Mizuki released two albums in 2007, her first compilation album The Museum, which peaked at No. 5 on Oricon, and her sixth studio album Great Activity, which peaked at No. 2 on Oricon.

In 2009, Mizuki released her seventh album Ultimate Diamond, which was the first album released by a Japanese voice actress to top the weekly Oricon albums chart since its inception in 1968. A similar record was set with the release of Mizuki's 21st single "Phantom Minds" (2010), which was the first single released by a Japanese voice actress to top the weekly Oricon singles chart since its inception. Mizuki released her eighth studio album Impact Exciter in 2010, which peaked at No. 2 on Oricon. Her second compilation album, The Museum II (2011), peaked at No. 3 on Oricon. Mizuki's next four studio albums were Rockbound Neighbors (2012), Supernal Liberty (2014), Smashing Anthems (2015) and Neogene Creation (2016). Her third compilation album, The Museum III, was released in 2018.

Albums

Studio albums

Compilation albums

Singles

Video albums

Music videos

Other album appearances
{|class="wikitable" border="1"
|-
!rowspan="1"| Year
!rowspan="1" width="250"| Song(s)
!rowspan="1"| Album
!rowspan="1"| Notes
!rowspan="1"| Ref.
|-
| rowspan="3"| 1998
| "Girl's Age"
| "Girl's Age"
| Image song single for the Microsoft Windows program "NOëL Task Launcher: Chisato da yo!".
|
|-
| "Merry X'mas"
| NOëL: La neige Rendez-vous
| Image song album for the video game NOëL: La neige.
| align="center"| 
|-
| "Sora to Kokoro to...""Yūdachi""Merry X'mas""Thermidorian""Monologue""Girl's Age"
| NOëL: La neige Départ Chisato×Nana
| Image song album for the video game NOëL: La neige; "Merry X'mas", "Monologue", and "Girl's Age" are featured as remixed versions.
| align="center"| 
|-
| rowspan="3"| 1999
| "Jikū no Kanata e""Kimitte Winking Shining Star"
| Space-Time Detective Genshi-kun Original Soundtrack Dacchi!
| Theme songs to the anime television series Flint the Time Detective.
| align="center"| 
|-
| "Dear. Friend""Send You My Love""Our Song"
| Webcast Program Nana Channel in Oct. 1999 featuring Nana Mizuki
| Theme songs to the Internet radio program Nana Channel.
| align="center"| 
|-
| "Natural""Tsubasa o Hirogete"
| Webcast Program Nana Channel in Nov.-Dec. 1999 featuring Nana Mizuki
| Theme songs to the Internet radio program Nana Channel.
| align="center"| 
|-
| rowspan="3"| 2000
| "Romantic Heart""Little Witch's Heart ver.R"
| Parfait Song Collection
| Image song theme songs for the video game Little Witch Lynette: Swan no Namida Rhapsody; included in the Parfait Fan Box.
| 
|-
| "Yūyakegumo no Mukō ni"
| "Yūyakegumo no Mukō ni / Kimi ga Iru kara"
| Image song single for the anime television series Happy Lesson.
| align="center"| 
|-
| "Omoi"
| Shōnen Shikaron
| Image song released on a drama CD for the Shōnen Shikaron manga series.
| align="center"| 
|-
| rowspan="8"| 2001
| "Ōji-sama to Amai Hoshi"
| Sister Princess: 12-nin no Tenshitachi
| Image song album for the anime television series Sister Princess.
| align="center"| 
|-
| "Let's Sing a Song"
| Vintage
| Theme song album for the radio program ES Hour Radio no Ojikan; "Let's Sing a Song" was sung by eight singers, including Nana Mizuki.
| align="center"| 
|-
| "Watashi no Uta: Shinobu & Nyamo Ver.""Nyamo-chan no Uta"
| Kimi Sakura Chiru Nakare!! Love Hina Spring Special
| Soundtrack to the anime television series Love Hina; "Nyamo-chan no Uta" is included as two remix versions.
| align="center"| 
|-
| "Suki Tōru Yume"
| Angel Jukebox
| Soundtrack to the anime television series Sister Princess.
| align="center"| 
|-
| "Otomegokoro wa Mangekyō: Kaleidoscope""Kiseki no Hito"
| Kaleidoscope
| Image song album for the anime television series Sister Princess.
| align="center"| 
|-
| "Shiawase Taishō"
| Mamimume Mogacho Ongaku-shū
| Soundtrack to the anime television series Mamimume Mogacho.
| align="center"| 
|-
| "Tōi Kono Sora kara"
| Memories Off 2nd Mini Album Collection Vol. 1 Tōi Kono Sora kara / Shirakawa Hotaru
| Image song album for the visual novel Memories Off 2nd.
| align="center"| 
|-
| "Namida Iro"
| Happy Lesson Hara Hara Music CD
| Image song album for the anime television series Happy Lesson.
| align="center"| 
|-
| rowspan="12"| 2002
| "Birdie, Birdie"
| "Success, Success"
| Theme song single for the anime television series Seven of Seven.
| align="center"| 
|-
| "Tōi Kono Sora kara""Orgel and Piano"
| Memo Off First Concert
| Theme song for the Memories Off video game series.
| align="center"| 
|-
| "New Frontier"
| Shichinin no Nana: Side Story of Nana Ongaku no Jikan
| Image song album for the anime television series Seven of Seven.
| align="center"| 
|-
| "Hana, Hoshi, Sora"
| Shaman King Vocal Collection: Uta no Manjien
| Image song album for the anime television series Shaman King.
| align="center"| 
|-
| "Tōi Kono Sora kara""Orgel and Piano"
| Memories Off 2nd Vocal Collection +α!!
| Image song album for the Memories Off video game series.
| align="center"| 
|-
| "Hamasaki Gakuen Kōka Seishō""Futatsu no Kokoro wa""Amenochi Omoide"
| Minna de Tsukuru Memo Off CD!!
| Image song album for the Memories Off video game series.
| align="center"| 
|-
| "Birdie, Birdie"
| Seven of Seven Original Soundtrack: Side Story of Nana II
| Soundtrack for the anime television series Seven of Seven.
| align="center"| 
|-
| "Tōi Kono Sora kara"
| Dream Melodies Iya: Scitron Discs Girls Vocal Best Selection
| Image song album for the Memories Off video game series.
| align="center"| 
|-
| "Orgel and Piano"
| Dream Melodies Moe: Scitron Discs Girls Vocal Best Selection
| Image song album for the Memories Off video game series.
| align="center"| 
|-
| "Brilliant Star"
| Shōnen Shikaron Plus
| Image song released on a drama CD for the Shōnen Shikaron Plus manga series.
| align="center"| 
|-
| "Replay Machine"
| Omoide Kawaru Kimi: Memories Off Sound Collection
| Image song album for the Memories Off video game series.
| align="center"| 
|-
| "Okujō Dance Paradise"
| "Happy Lesson Character CD 1 Rokumatsuri Minazuki"
| Image song single for the anime television series Happy Lesson.
| 
|-
| rowspan="9"| 2003
| "Yasashii Mori""Ai no Choco Souffle""Akai Akai Hana: The Wild Flower"
| Angelic Concert Vocal Collection
| Image song album for the video game Angelic Concert.
| align="center"| 
|-
| "Nocturne"
| Memories Off 2nd Sound Collection
| Soundtrack to the Memories Off 2nd visual novel
| align="center"| 
|-
| "Okujō Dance Paradise"
| Happy Lesson Zoku Zoku Music CD
| Image song album for the anime television series Happy Lesson.
| align="center"| 
|-
| "Replay Machine"
| Omoide Kawaru Kimi: Memories Off Vocal Collection
| Image song album for the Memories Off video game series.
| align="center"| 
|-
| "Kokoro ni Saku Hana no Yō ni""Mirai Kono Hoshi de""Orgel and Piano""Tōi Kono Sora kara"
| Game Vocal Best: Shikura Chiyomaru Gakkyō-shū Vol.1
| Image song compilation album of songs composed by Chiyomaru Shikura.
| align="center"| 
|-
| "Replay Machine"
| Game Vocal Best: Shikura Chiyomaru Gakkyō-shū Vol.2
| Image song compilation album of songs composed by Chiyomaru Shikura.
| align="center"| 
|-
| "Oh Yes!"
| Sakura: Setsugekka Gekichū Uta Zenshū
| Image song album for the video game Sakura: Setsugekka.
| align="center"| 
|-
| "Sono Kiseki wa Eikyū ni""Merry Very X'mas"
| Sister Princess: Christmas Song Collection
| Image song album for the anime television series Sister Princess. The songs are sung in collaboration by the twelve main cast members.
| align="center"| 
|-
| "Oshiete Sensei-san""Kanransha""Haru Uta: Kururu""Shiki Uta: Binzume Yōsei"
| Four Seasons
| Image and theme song album for the anime television series Bottle Fairy.
| align="center"| 
|-
| rowspan="11"| 2004
| "Kiss Me Kiss Me"
| Melody
| Image song album for the anime television series Happy Lesson.
| align="center"| 
|-
| "Drive Away Dream"
| OVA Hourglass of Summer Sound Collection
| Image song album for the original video animation (OVA) series Hourglass of Summer.
| align="center"| 
|-
| "Panorama"
| Lost Aya Sophia Original Soundtrack
| Soundtrack to the video game Lost Aya Sophia.
| align="center"| 
|-
| "Oshiete Sensei-san: Natsu"
| Asa Hiru Yoru
| Image song album for the anime television series Bottle Fairy.
| align="center"| 
|-
| "Shinjitsu o Mitsumete"
| Kaiketsu! Osaba Kiina Original Soundtrack Album
| Soundtrack to the video game Kaiketsu! Osaba Kiina.
| align="center"| 
|-
| "Soredemo Kimi o Omoidasu kara"
| Memories Off: Sorekara Sound Collection
| Soundtrack to the visual novel Memories Off: Sorekara.
| align="center"|  
|-
| "Nocturne""Drive Away Dream"
| Game Vocal Best: Shikura Chiyomaru Gakkyō-shū Vol.3
| Image song compilation album of songs composed by Chiyomaru Shikura.
| align="center"| 
|-
| "With: Chiisana Chikara"
| Ragnarok the Animation Soundtrack & Character Songs
| Theme songs to the anime television series Ragnarok the Animation.
| align="center"| 
|-
| "Dare yori mo Kitto: For Memories"
| Minna de Tsukuru Memo Off CD!! Part 2
| Image song album for the Memories Off video game series.
| align="center"| 
|-
| "Ikinari Kiss""Shinobu Ondo"
| Ninin ga Shinobuden Soundtrack & Songs
| Theme songs to the anime television series Ninin ga Shinobuden.
| align="center"| 
|-
| "Soredemo Kimi o Omoidasu kara"
| Memories Off: Sorekara Vocal Collection
| Image song album to the visual novel Memories Off: Sorekara.
| align="center"| 
|-
| rowspan="12"| 2005
| "Wish"
| Magical Girl Lyrical Nanoha Sound Stage 02
| Theme song for a drama CD for the anime television series Magical Girl Lyrical Nanoha.
| align="center"| 
|-
| "Kimi Iro 100%"
| Kimi Iro 100%
| Image song album for the anime television series Strawberry 100%.
| align="center"| 
|-
| "Orgel and Piano""Nocturne""Replay Machine""Soredemo Kimi o Omoidasu kara"
| Memo Off Theme Song Collection
| Theme song collection album for the Memories Off video game series.
| align="center"| 
|-
| "Replay Machine"
| Memories Off Collectors Box: Omoide ni Kawaru Kimi Memories Off kara Memories Off: Sorekara
| Box set containing previously released image song album collections for the Memories Off video game series.
| align="center"| 
|-
| "Tatta Hitotsu no Sora"
| Tactics Sound File Vol. 2
| Soundtrack to the anime television series Tactics.
| align="center"| 
|-
| "Skyblue Gradation"
| Magical Girl Lyrical Nanoha Sound Stage 03
| Theme song for the drama CD for the anime television series Magical Girl Lyrical Nanoha.
| align="center"| 
|-
| "Innocent Starter"
| Magical Girl Lyrical Nanoha Original Soundtrack
| Soundtrack to the anime television series Magical Girl Lyrical Nanoha.
| align="center"| 
|-
| "Oneness"
| "Oneness"
| Theme song to the concert Animelo Summer Live 2005: The Bridge.
| 
|-
| "Lost Days"
| Paradise| Image song album for the anime television series Koi Koi Seven.
| align="center"| 
|-
| "Kokoro Capsule"
| Strawberry 100% Character File 3 Minamoto Yui| Image song single for the anime television series Strawberry 100%.
| align="center"| 
|-
| "Wild Eyes"
| Basilisk: Kōga Ninpō Chō Onemaki Daini Shō| Soundtrack to the anime television series Basilisk.
| align="center"| 
|-
| "Purism×Egoist"
| Purism×Egoist Vol.1: Ponwari School Days Zenpen| Theme song for the drama CD for the visual novel Purism×Egoist.
| align="center"| 
|-
| rowspan="12"| 2006
| "Kimi Iro 100%""Kokoro Capsule"
| Strawberry 100% Original Soundtrack| Soundtrack to the anime television series Strawberry 100%.
| align="center"| 
|-
| "Tsubasa"
| Magical Girl Lyrical Nanoha A's Sound Stage 02| Theme song for the drama CD for the anime television series Magical Girl Lyrical Nanoha A's.
| align="center"| 
|-
| "Kaze ni Mau Hana"
| Magical Girl Lyrical Nanoha A's Sound Stage 03| Theme song for the drama CD for the anime television series Magical Girl Lyrical Nanoha A's.
| align="center"| 
|-
| "Ohayō""Ai ni Oide Ai ni Oide"
| "Ohayō / Ai ni Oide Ai ni Oide"
| Theme song single for the anime television series Yoshinaga-san Chi no Gargoyle.
| align="center"| 
|-
| "Outride"
| "Outride"
| Theme song to the concert Animelo Summer Live 2006: Outride.
| align="center"| 
|-
| "Promise You""Ai ni Oide Ai ni Oide: Riri Version"
| Yoshinaga-san Chi no Gargoyle Character Song Riri| Image song single for the anime television series Yoshinaga-san Chi no Gargoyle.
| align="center"| 
|-
| "Tsubasa""Skyblue Gradation""Kaze ni Mau Hana""Wish"
| Magical Girl Lyrical Nanoha A's Sound Stage Vocal Best Collection| Image song album for the drama CD series for the anime television series Magical Girl Lyrical Nanoha A's; each of the tracks are featured as remixed versions.
| align="center"| 
|-
| "Sunao Princess"
| Tsuyokiss Cool×Sweet Complete Selection| Soundtrack to the anime television series Tsuyokiss.
| align="center"| 
|-
| "Kamarete mo Suki na Hito"
| Rosario + Vampire 2| Theme song for the drama CD for the manga series Rosario + Vampire.
| 
|-
| "Lightning Arc"
| Twinkle Saber Nova: Hirusagari no Whisper| Theme song for the drama CD for the manga series Twinkle Saber Nova.
| 
|-
| "Kei no Uta"
| Inukami! Special CD Go!| Image song for the anime television series Inukami!; the song was bundled with the special edition version of the fifth DVD compilation volume for the anime.
| align="center"| 
|-
| "Go Smile"
| Kiba Original Soundtrack Vol. 1| Soundtrack to the anime television series Kiba.
| align="center"| 
|-
| rowspan="12"| 2007
| "Justice to Believe (ver. Beginning)"
| Wild Arms the Vth Vanguard Original Score Vol. 1| Soundtrack to the video game Wild Arms 5.
| align="center"| 
|-
| "Justice to Believe (ver. Ground Zero)"
| Wild Arms the Vth Vanguard Original Score Vol. 2| Soundtrack to the video game Wild Arms 5.
| align="center"| 
|-
| "Kaze no Fuku Basho"
| Kiba Original Soundtrack Vol. 2| Soundtrack to the anime television series Kiba.
| align="center"| 
|-
| "Generation-A"
| "Generation-A"
| Theme song to the concert Animelo Summer Live 2007: Generation-A.
| align="center"| 
|-
| "Present"
| Magical Girl Lyrical Nanoha Strikers Sound Stage 02| Theme song for the drama CD for the anime television series Magical Girl Lyrical Nanoha Strikers.
| align="center"| 
|-
| "Fiat lux: Hikari Are"
| Tales of Symphonia The Animation Bonus Disc II Collector's Edition Original Soundtrack| Soundtrack to the OVA series Tales of Symphonia.
| 
|-
| "Watashi Dake no Melody"
| Meta-morphose| Image song album for the anime television series Shinkyoku Sōkai Polyphonica.
| align="center"| 
|-
| "Uchi e Kaerō"
| Tales of Symphonia The Animation Bonus Disc III Collector's Edition Original Soundtrack| Soundtrack to the OVA series Tales of Symphonia.
| 
|-
| "Meikyū Butterfly""Blue Moon"
| "Meikyū Butterfly"
| Image song single for the anime television series Shugo Chara!.
| align="center"| 
|-
| "Endless Chain"
|Magical Girl Lyrical Nanoha Strikers Sound Stage 04| Theme song for the drama CD for the anime television series Magical Girl Lyrical Nanoha Strikers.
| align="center"| 
|-
| "Omoi no Yukue"
| Tales of Symphonia The Animation Bonus Disc IV Collector's Edition Original Soundtrack & Mini Drama| Soundtrack to the OVA series Tales of Symphonia.
| 
|-
| "Crystal Heart"
| Shōkan Shōjo: Elemental Girl Calling Character Song Mini Album| Image song album for the video game Shōkan Shōjo: Elemental Girl Calling.
| align="center"| 
|-
| rowspan="14"| 2008
| "Aoki Hikari no Hate"
| "Ayakashi Characters Vol.1 Yoake Eim"
| Image song single for the visual novel Ayakashi.
| align="center"| 
|-
| "Akai Jōnetstu""Akai Sweet Pea"
| "Rosario + Vampire Character Song 1 Akashiya Moka"
| Image song single for the anime television series Rosario + Vampire.
| align="center"| 
|-
| "Soba ni Ite ne: Wanna Be With You"
| Dragonaut Drama & Character Song vol.2| Drama CD and image song album for the anime television series Dragonaut: The Resonance.
| align="center"| 
|-
| "Gin'iro no Hane"
| Mushi-Uta Bug| Image song for the anime television series Mushi-Uta; the song was bundled with the sixth DVD compilation volume for the anime.
| align="center"| 
|-
| "Tsumetai Rosary""Toki no Kawa o Koete"
| "Rosario + Vampire Character Song 6 The Capucchu"
| Image song single for the anime television series Rosario + Vampire.
| align="center"| 
|-
| "Mirai Travel"
| Minami-ke Biyori| Image song album for the anime television series Minami-ke.
| align="center"| 
|-
| "Sora ni Naru Tsubasa"
| Allison & Lillia Drama CD I: Allison to Wil Another Story| Theme song for the drama CD for the anime television series Allison & Lillia.
| align="center"| 
|-
| "Aoki Hikari no Hate"
| Ayakashi The Best Vocal Collection| Image song album for the anime television series Ayakashi.
| align="center"| 
|-
| "Yells: It's a Beautiful Life"
| "Yells: It's a Beautiful Life"
| Theme song to the concert Animelo Summer Live 2008: Challenge.
| align="center"| 
|-
| "Black Diamond"
| "Black Diamond"
| Image song single for the anime television series Shugo Chara!; two versions of the song are included.
| align="center"| 
|-
| "Anata ni Capu chu!""Desire: Jōnetsu"
| "Rosario + Vampire Capu2 Character Song 1 Akashiya Moka"
| Image song single for the anime television series Rosario + Vampire Capu2.
| align="center"| 
|-
| "Yakusoku no Katachi"
| Allison & Lillia Drama CD II: Lillia to Treize Another Story| Theme song for the drama CD for the anime television series Allison & Lillia.
| align="center"| 
|-
| "Shalala: Watashi ni Kureta Mono"
| "Rosario + Vampire Capu2 Character Song 7 The Capucchu"
| Image song single for the anime television series Rosario + Vampire Capu2.
| align="center"| 
|-
| "Cosmic Love""Discotheque""Dancing in the Velvet Moon""Trinity Cross"
| Rosario + Vampire Original Soundtrack| Soundtrack to the anime television series Rosario + Vampire.
| align="center"| 
|-
| rowspan="16"| 2009
| "I'm In Love"
| Itazura na Kiss Original Soundtrack & More ItaKiss Station| Soundtrack to the anime television series Itazura na Kiss.
| align="center"| 
|-
| "Akai Sweet Pea""Toki no Kawa o Koete""Desire: Jōnetsu""Mugo N Iroppoi"
| Rosario + Vampire Idol Cover Best| Image song album for the anime television series Rosario + Vampire and Rosario + Vampire Capu2.
| align="center"| 
|-
| "Hoshi no Sasayaku Monogatari"
| "Keroro Japon!"
| Theme song single for the anime television series Sgt. Frog.
| align="center"| 
|-
| "Present""Endless Chain"
| Magical Girl Lyrical Nanoha Strikers Sound Stage Vocal Best Collection| Image song album for the drama CD series for the anime television series Magical Girl Lyrical Nanoha Strikers; each of the tracks are featured as remixed versions.
| align="center"| 
|-
| "Heartful Song""Yume no Tsubomi"
| Shugo Chara! Character Song Collection| Image song album for the anime television series Shugo Chara!.
| align="center"| 
|-
| "Sound of Destiny""Garasu no Hana"
| "Sound of Destiny"
| Image song single for the anime television series White Album.
| align="center"| 
|-
| "Ribbon no Onpu"
| "Shinkyoku Sōkai Polyphonica Crimson S Character Song Vol.3"
| Image song single for the anime television series Shinkyoku Sōkai Polyphonica Crimson S.
| align="center"| 
|-
| "Re:Bridge: Return to Oneself"
| "Re:Bridge: Return to Oneself"
| Theme song to the concert Animelo Summer Live 2009: Re:Bridge.
| align="center"| 
|-
| "Mirai Travel"
| Minami-ke Character Songs Best Album| Image song album for the anime television series Minami-ke.
| align="center"| 
|-
| "Taiyō ga Niau yo"
| Shugo Chara! Character Song Collection 2| Image song album for the anime television series Shugo Chara!! Doki—.
| align="center"| 
|-
| "Kimi ga Kureta Kiseki"
| Magical Girl Lyrical Nanoha The Movie 1st Drama CD Side-F| Theme song for the drama CD for the anime film Magical Girl Lyrical Nanoha The Movie.
| 
|-
| "Juliet"
| The Works: Shikura Chiyomaru Gakkyō-shū 4.0| Image song compilation album of songs composed by Chiyomaru Shikura.
| align="center"| 
|-
| "Brilliant Star"
| The Works: Shikura Chiyomaru Gakkyō-shū 5.0| Image song compilation album of songs composed by Chiyomaru Shikura.
| align="center"| 
|-
| "Fiat lux: Hikari Are""Uchi e Kaerō""Omoi no Yukue"
| Tales of Symphonia The Animation Sylvarant Songs| Image song album for the OVA series Tales of Symphonia; instrumental versions of the songs are also included.
| align="center"| 
|-
| "Karakaze""Sotto, Sotto"
| "Theme of Lan Fan by The Alchemists"
| Image song single for the anime television series Fullmetal Alchemist.
| align="center"| 
|-
| "Omoide no Record""Kono Shiawase yo Eien ni""Hakanaki Inochi no Tabidachi""Jenis no Namida""Eien no Utahime""Hoshi no Uta""Umi no Uta""Taiyō no Uta""Ai no Omoide"
| The Eternal Diva| Theme song collection for the film Professor Layton and the Eternal Diva.
| align="center"| 
|-
| rowspan="14"| 2010
| "Powder Snow""1986-nen no Marilyn"
| "Powder Snow"
| Image song single for the anime television series White Album.
| align="center"| 
|-
| "Eien no Utahime"
| Professor Layton and the Eternal Diva Original Soundtrack| Soundtrack to the film Professor Layton and the Eternal Diva.
| align="center"| 
|-
| "Red Orpheus: Aka no Shinwa""Call From Eve"
| White Album Sound Stage 1| Theme song for a drama CD for the anime television series White Album.
| align="center"| 
|-
| "Akeneiro no Sora"
| Shugo Chara! Character Song Collection 3| Image song album for the anime television series Shugo Chara!!! Dokki Doki.
| align="center"| 
|-
| "Dangan Shōjo"
| White Album Sound Stage 2| Theme song for a drama CD for the anime television series White Album.
| align="center"| 
|-
| "Shin'ai""Mugen""Sound of Destiny""Powder Snow (Live. Ver)""Powder Snow (Yuki & Rina Ver.)"
| White Album Character Song Best & Soundtrack| Theme songs for the anime television series White Album.
| align="center"| 
|-
| "Koi no Yokushiryoku"
| "Heaven's Divide / Koi no Yokushiryoku"
| Image song single for the video game Metal Gear Solid: Peace Walker.
| align="center"| 
|-
| "Koi no Yokushiryoku"
| Metal Gear Solid Peace Walker Original Soundtrack| Soundtrack to the video game Metal Gear Solid: Peace Walker.
| align="center"| 
|-
| "Tsu Bo Mi: Flower Flower"
| "Tsu Bo Mi: Flower Flower / Special Colorful"
| Theme song single for the anime television series HeartCatch PreCure!.
| align="center"| 
|-
| "Heaven in the Hell"
| Shinakoi| Ending theme song for a drama CD for the manga series Shinakoi.
| align="center"| 
|-
| "Karakaze""Sotto, Sotto"
| Theme of Fullmetal Alchemist by The Alchemists| Image song compilation album for the anime television series Fullmetal Alchemist.
| align="center"| 
|-
| "Evolution (For Beloved One)"
| "Evolution (For Beloved One)"
| Theme song to the concert Animelo Summer Live 2010: Evolution.
| align="center"| 
|-
|"Tsu Bo Mi: Future Flower (Promenade remix)""Open the World""Kokoro no Hana"
| HeartCatch PreCure! Vocal Album 1: Earth, Sea, Sun and Moon| Vocal album for the anime television series HeartCatch PreCure!.
| align="center"| 
|-
| "Egao no Yukue"
| Otoko to Onna 3: Two Hearts Two Voices| A duet with Junichi Inagaki.
| align="center"| 
|-
| rowspan="1"| 2011
| "Renbu Minuet"
| Koisuru Otome no Rhapsody| Image song for the character Nanase Kotobuki from the "Koisuru Otome no Rhapsody" episode of the Book Girl Memoir OVA series.
| align="center"| 
|-
| rowspan="5"| 2012
| "Gyakkō no Flugel""Orbital Beat"
| Senki Zesshō Symphogear Character Song #1| Image song single for the anime television series Senki Zesshō Symphogear (duet with Minami Takayama).
| align="center"| 
|-
| "Zettō (Ame no Habakiri)""Flight Feathers"
| Senki Zesshō Symphogear Character Song #3| Image song single for the anime television series Senki Zesshō Symphogear.
| align="center"| 
|-
| "First Love Song"
| Senki Zesshō Symphogear BD/DVD Volume 6 CD| Image song single for the anime television series Senki Zesshō Symphogear (trio with Aoi Yūki and Ayahi Takagaki).
| align="center"| 
|-
| "Seimei no Ōka"
| Shining Blade Character Song Album| Image song for the video game Shining Blade.
| align="center"| 
|-
| "Sound of Destiny"
| Aquaplus Vocal Collection Vol. 8| Image song for the anime television series White Album.
| align="center"| 
|-
| rowspan="4"| 2013
| "Sōkai Shooting"
| Minami-ke Tadaima Character Song Album Minami-ke no Minauta| Image song for the anime television series Minami-ke: Tadaima.
| align="center"| 
|-
| "Preserved Roses"
| "Preserved Roses"
| Opening theme for the anime television series Valvrave the Liberator (duet with T.M.Revolution).
| align="center"| 
|-
| "Gekkō no Tsurugi""Koi no Okehamaza"
| Senki Zesshou Symphogear G Character Song 4| Image song single for the anime television series Senki Zesshō Symphogear G.
| align="center"| 
|-
| "Kakumei Dualism"
| "Kakumei Dualism"
| Opening theme for the anime television series Valvrave the Liberator (duet with T.M.Revolution).
| align="center"| 
|-
| rowspan="1"| 2014
| "Fuyu no Owari ni"
| "Fuyu no Owari ni"
| Image song single for the anime film The Last: Naruto the Movie.
| align="center"|
|-
| rowspan="5"| 2015
| "Tenkuu no Aria Amakakeru Toki no Tsubasa"
| "Tenkuu no Aria Amakakeru Toki no Tsubasa"
| Image song single for the video game Shining Resonance.
| align="center"|
|-
| "Seiten Galaxy Cross"
| Senki Zesshō Symphogear GX Character Song #1| Image song single for the anime television series Senki Zesshō Symphogear GX (duet with Yoko Hikasa).
| align="center"|
|-
| "Beyond the Blade""Sora e..."
| Senki Zesshō Symphogear GX Character Song #3| Image song single for the anime television series Senki Zesshō Symphogear GX.
| align="center"|
|-
| "Radiant Force"
| Senki Zesshō Symphogear GX BD/DVD Volume 1 CD| Image song single for the anime television series Senki Zesshō Symphogear GX (trio with Aoi Yūki and Ayahi Takagaki).
| align="center"|
|-
| "Bayonet Charge"
| Senki Zesshō Symphogear GX BD/DVD Volume 3 CD| Image song single for the anime television series Senki Zesshō Symphogear GX (duet with Ayahi Takagaki).
| align="center"|
|-
| rowspan="2"| 2017
| "Gekka Bijin"
| Senki Zesshō Symphogear AXZ Character Song #3| Image song single for the anime television series Senki Zesshō Symphogear AXZ.
| align="center"|
|-
| "Luminous Gate"
| Senki Zesshō Symphogear AXZ Character Song #3| Image song single for the anime television series Senki Zesshō Symphogear AXZ.
| align="center"|
|}

Other video album appearances

Notes and references
 A remixed version of "Justice to Believe" was later released on Nana Mizuki's compilation album The Museum, but "Aoi Iro" was not released on an album until Great Activity''.

General

Specific

External links
Nana Mizuki's official website 
Nana Mizuki at Discogs

Discographies of Japanese artists
Pop music discographies